{{Speciesbox
| image = 200105o05.jpg
| image_caption = (Rasbora paviana in aquarium)
| taxon = Rasbora paviana
| status = LC
| status_system = IUCN3.1
| status_ref =  
| display_parents = 3
| authority = Tirant, 1885
| synonyms = 
 Rasbora cromiei Fowler, 1937
 Rasbora paviei Chevey, 1932
}}

The sidestripe rasbora (Rasbora paviana) is a species of ray-finned fish in the genus Rasbora from the continental Southeast Asia.The epitheton paviana'' does not derive from the similar sounding German word for baboon, but from Auguste Pavie.
.

References 

Fish of Thailand
Rasboras
Fish of the Mekong Basin
Fish of Cambodia
Fish of Laos
Fish of Vietnam
Fish described in 1885
Taxa named by Gilbert Tirant